This video game related article is a stub. You can help wikipedia by expanding it.
X-treme Express is a video game released for the PlayStation 2 on 21 February 2001, in Japan and on 18 March 2002, in Great Britain. It has also been released in Australia. It was developed by Syscom Entertainment and published by Midas Interactive Entertainment.

The game is about racing trains, which vary from North America, Europe and other parts of the world. The goal in Grand prix mode is to get to the finish line first, although on each track you race to the end and then in reverse in two different races. The other modes are Tour, in which you complete a number of tests and scenarios to unlock more trains; Free mode, where you can choose what track you race on and the time of day the race is on; and VS mode, where you can play against other players. The difficulty setting can be changed to suit the player's skill level and on the easiest mode the train will never derail when going around curves. On the harder modes, if the player does not slow down and move the centre of gravity meter to counteract the G-forces of the curves, the train will derail. There over 80 trains in the game, some of which are themed, and 10 tracks to race on.

References

2001 video games
PlayStation 2 games
PlayStation Network games
Racing video games
Multiplayer and single-player video games
Video games developed in Japan
PlayStation 2-only games
RenderWare games